Vaughn Hall Mancha (October 7, 1921January 27, 2011) was a professional American football player who played professionally for the Boston Yanks.  He was inducted into the College Football Hall of Fame in 1990. He was named to the All-SEC team during his career at the University of Alabama, where he played from 1944 through 1947. Earned all-SEC & All American honors as a four-year starter at the University of Alabama; played in Rose Bowl and two Sugar Bowls; voted All-Time Sugar Bowl team. Coached football at Livingston State University, Columbia University, and Florida State University and served as FSU Athletic Director.

Other honors include induction into the Florida State Sports Hall of Fame, the Tallahassee Sports Hall of Fame, and was selected to Alabama's All-Century Team. He was married to Sybil Mancha. They have three children and four grandchildren.

Head coaching record

References

External links
 

1921 births
2011 deaths
American football centers
Alabama Crimson Tide football players
Boston Yanks players
Columbia Lions football coaches
Florida State Seminoles athletic directors
West Alabama Tigers football coaches
All-American college football players
College Football Hall of Fame inductees
People from Gordon County, Georgia
Sportspeople from Birmingham, Alabama
Players of American football from Birmingham, Alabama
Ramsay High School alumni